Filin is a rural locality (a khutor) in Ostrovskoye Rural Settlement, Danilovsky District, Volgograd Oblast, Russia. The population was 63 as of 2010. There are 6 streets.

Geography 
Filin is located 28 km east of Danilovka (the district's administrative centre) by road. Krasny is the nearest rural locality.

References 

Rural localities in Danilovsky District, Volgograd Oblast